Noureddine Bahbouh (24 January 1949 – 6 August 2021) was the Algerian minister of agriculture in the 1995 government of Mokdad Sifi. He was born in Bordj Bou Arréridj, Algeria, France.

References 

1949 births
2021 deaths
Algerian politicians
Government ministers of Algeria
People from Bordj Bou Arréridj
21st-century Algerian people